Simha Bhagavathula, known mononymously as Simha, is an Indian playback singer who predominantly works in Telugu cinema. He was introduced into movies by music composer Chakri. He is known for his collaborations with composers S. Thaman and Devi Sri Prasad. He won Filmfare Award for Best Male Playback Singer – Telugu for his song Cinema Choopistha Mava in the film Race Gurram.

Personal life and career 
Simha started his career with the film Nenu Pelliki Ready (2003) and has sung numerous songs in Telugu cinema. "Cinema Choopistha Mava", "Blockbuster", "Kick", "Dhimmathirigae", "Alludu Seenu", "Khakhee Chokka" and "Bhoom Bhaddhal" are among his popular songs that have become chartbusters.

Selected discography

References

Living people
1987 births
21st-century Indian male singers
21st-century Indian singers
Telugu-language singers
Indian male playback singers
Filmfare Awards winners